L'Hypogée des Dunes is an underground chapel (Hypogeum) in Poitiers, France. The chapel is one of the few surviving structures from Merovingian times.

The chapel has a tomb containing approximately 35 burials.

References

Subterranea (geography)